Events from the year 1655 in France

Incumbents
 Monarch – Louis XIV

Events

Births
14 February – Jacques-Nicolas Colbert, churchman (died 1707)
30 September – Charles III, Prince of Guéméné, nobleman (died 1727)
4 October – Lothar Franz von Schönborn, archbishop (died 1729)

Deaths

27 February – Henri Chabot, nobleman (born 1616)
6 April – David Blondel, clergyman, historian and classical scholar (born 1591)
28 July – Cyrano de Bergerac, novelist and playwright, (born 1619)
7 September – François Tristan l'Hermite, dramatist (born c.1601)
24 October – Pierre Gassendi, philosopher, priest, scientist, astronomer and mathematician (born 1592)

See also

References

1650s in France